Into the Light is the eighth studio album by British-Irish singer Chris de Burgh, released in 1986 by A&M Records. The album is notable for featuring de Burgh's biggest hit, "The Lady in Red".

The album peaked at number two on the UK Albums Chart, becoming de Burgh's first studio album to enter the top ten.

"Fatal Hesitation" was a UK number 44 hit, spending four weeks on the chart. "Say Goodbye to It All" was a continuation of the song "Borderline" from 1982's The Getaway. Both songs frequently appear in de Burgh's concerts and compilation albums. The song "For Rosanna" is dedicated to de Burgh's then-2-year-old daughter Rosanna.

Track listing
All songs written by Chris de Burgh.

Personnel 

 Chris de Burgh – lead and backing vocals, guitars, LinnDrum Machine
 Danny McBride – guitars
 Phil Palmer – guitars
 Patrick Miles – lead guitar 
 John Giblin – bass
 Al Marnie – bass
 Pino Palladino – bass
 Nick Glennie-Smith – keyboards
 Glenn Morrow – keyboards
 Andy Richards – keyboards
 Tony Beard – drums
 Peter Van Hooke – drums
 Jeff Phillips – drums, percussion 
 Gary Barnacle – saxophone
 Ian Kojima – saxophone
 Carol Kenyon – backing vocals (6)

Production 

 Produced, engineered and mixed by Paul Hardiman
 Assistant engineers – Dick Beetham and Steve Chase
 Art direction and design – Mike Ross and John Warwicker
 Art dictator – Dave Margereson
 Photography – Richard Haughton
 Cover painting – Mike Doud
 Management – Dave Margereson and Kenny Thomson for Mismanagement, Inc.

Charts

Weekly charts

Year-end charts

Certifications

References 

1986 albums
A&M Records albums
Albums produced by Paul Hardiman
Chris de Burgh albums